Colotis protomedia, the yellow splendour tip, is a butterfly in the family Pieridae. It is found in north-eastern Nigeria, northern Cameroon, Chad, southern Sudan, northern Uganda, Ethiopia, Somaliland, south-western Saudi Arabia, Yemen, Somalia, Kenya, Tanzania and the Democratic Republic of the Congo. The habitat consists of dry savannah.

Adults have a fast flight. They are attracted to flowers, especially those of Maerua species.

The larvae feed on Maerua species.

References

External links
Images representing Colotis protomedia at Bold

Butterflies described in 1829
protomedia